Carl Geigy (24 June 1860, in Steinen, Baden-Württemberg – 3 January 1943, in Münchenstein) (also Karl) was a famous Swiss Philanthropist.

Biography
Geigy was son of Carl (1834–1862), Basler Entrepreneur, and Margaretha Emilie Burckhardt (1838–1911). His grandfather was Karl Geigy (1798–1861) President of the Swiss Centralbahngesellschaft.

Carl Geigy grew up in Basel, Switzerland, and visited the Gymnasium and the vocational school in Basel. He served his apprenticeship as mechanical engineer in Lausanne. He  continued his professional training in a weaving factory in Bradford and in a spinning mill in Oldham. Here Carl Geigy became acquainted with the social problems of the working class.

Following a journey around the world he returned to Switzerland in 1887. He was co-founder of the engineering association in Basel. From 1904 onwards he withdrew from his professional career.

Carl Geigy lived in the Bruckgut estate in Münchenstein and built the farm house and barn there in 1888. He married Julia Elisabeth Burckhardt (1872–1949) from Basel in 1897. They had four children, Eduard (1899–1941), Julie (1900–1966), Jenny (1903–1990) and Karl Felix (1904–1977).
 
Following his withdrawal from his occupation, he devoted his time to the social humanitarian and religious tasks. He dedicated himself to the building of the children's hospital in Basel. Carl Geigy became famous as philanthropist and was a father figure in Münchenstein, where he was awarded the honorary citizenship in 1937.

Literature
personal data in: Zur Erinnerung an Carl Geigy-Burckhardt, printed brochure 1943, pages 5 to 11. - Nekrolog in: BN 5.1.1943

People from Basel-Stadt
Münchenstein
1860 births
1943 deaths